The Edge is a youth-oriented New Zealand entertainment brand consisting of a national radio network, a music television channel - The Edge TV, and an entertainment website. It is owned and operated by MediaWorks New Zealand.

The station was founded in Hamilton in 1994 and is now based in Auckland; it broadcasts nationwide over multiple channels. Research International audience surveys suggest The Edge has approximately 581,200 listeners across all markets that are surveyed and the station makes up 7.0% of the New Zealand radio market.

The network is most successful in Waikato, Rotorua and Nelson surveys and in the 15–19 and 10–14 female demographics, whereas rival station ZM is most popular with listeners aged between 20 and 34. The station's breakfast programme is number two in the ratings for nationwide commercial breakfast radio; its 240,000 listeners compare with 325,600 listeners for the top-rating Newstalk ZB. This compares with the non-commercial RNZ National whose breakfast programme, Morning Report, has an audience of 522,000 listeners.

History

Early years

In 1994 both Buzzard 98FM, The Rock 93FM and The Rock 100FM in Taranaki were sold to the Taranaki-based company Energy Enterprises which operated Energy FM in the area. Buzzard 98FM was rebranded as The Edge 97.8FM and switched to a Top 40 format, first airing on 8 August 1994.

The Edge TV

The Edge TV is the brand's TV channel. It was launched on 27 June 2014 as a replacement of C4, and airs music videos, specialist music and pop culture shows and original video content filmed with The Edge radio hosts. It is available free-to-air on Kordia digital terrestrial and Sky satellite services, as well as online.  On 1 July 2019, it moved to online only, with its terrestrial broadcast element being replaced by ThreeLife + 1.  It returned to terrestrial broadcast on 26 March 2020, replacing ThreeLife. In September 2020, MediaWorks sold the TV portion of its business including Edge TV to Discovery, Inc.

Programs

Breakfast 

, hosted by Clint Randell, Megan Mansell and Dan Webby, is The Edge's flagship breakfast programme which airs 6 am–10 am, Monday–Friday. They are joined by producer Brock and newsreader Sophie Nathan. A podcast of the show is produced and released on Rova, Spotify, iTunes and Soundcloud. Previous hosts of The Edge's breakfast show include Nickson Clark, Elim Matthewson Dom Harvey, Jay-Jay Feeney, Mike Puru, Jason Reeves, Martin Devlin, Malcolm Paul, Brian "Butt Ugly Bob" Reid, and Jesse Mulligan.

Workday 
 airs 10 am–3 pm, Monday–Friday and is hosted by Sophie Nathan ("Social Soph"). Previous hosts of The Edge's days show include Steph Monks, Sarah Gandy, Guy Mansell, Sam Robertson, Megan Mansell, Sharyn Casey, Megan Sellers, Clint Roberts, Joe Cotton, Angelina Boyd, Tarsh Tolson, and Jay-Jay Feeney.

Afternoons 
 airs 3 pm–7 pm, Monday–Friday and is hosted by Sharyn Casey, Steph Monks & Nickson Clark with producer Cal Payne & Intern "Yas".  Previous hosts of The Edge's drive show include Jayden King, Jono Pryor, Ben Boyce, Guy Williams, Clint Roberts, Carl "Fletch" Fletcher, Vaughan Smith, Megan Sellers, Chang Hung, Alex Behan, Iain Stables, Blair Dowling, Jason Reeves, Jay-Jay Feeney, and Brian "Butt Ugly Bob" Reid.

Nights 
 airs 7 pm–12 am, Monday–Friday, and is hosted by Sean Hill. The show is host to The Edge Top 20 as voted for by listeners each night at 8 pm. In 2020, a second chart, the TikTok Top 10 was introduced. These charts replaced the Nightly Nineteen that featured in 2019. Prior to 2019, the show was named The Edge 30, The Edge Nightshow and Smash! 20. Previous hosts of The Edge's night show include Haylee Clarke, Marty Heheworth, Steph Monks, Guy Mansell, Sam Robertson, Brad Watson, Sharyn Casey, Carolyn Taylor, and Mike Puru.

Weekends

The Edge Bottomless Brunch airs 6–10 am on Saturday and is presented by Edge night host Sean Hill and Edge Workdays host Sophie Nathan

The station's signature weekend program, The Edge 40, airs in the afternoon. It airs on Saturday from 2 to 5 p.m. and is hosted by Sean Hill and Sophie Nathan.The show was previously named The Edge Fresh 40 and The Edge Fat 40. Previous hosts of The Edge 40 include: Jono Pryor, Ben Boyce, Sharyn Casey, Guy Williams, Clint Roberts, Sam Robertson, Carl "Fletch" Fletcher, Vaughan Smith, Megan Sellers, Chang Hung, Alex Behan, Iain Stables & Blair Dowling

Before The Edge Mix with DJ Sean Hill The Edge Pre's which airs 5-10 pm and is hosted by Brydon playing Hit Music Now

 airs Saturdays 10 pm–2am and is an advertisement-free show with songs mixed by DJ Sean Hill. Over the summer of 2022/2023 it is hosted by DJ duo Jupiter Project. It was previously mixed by American electronic and dance duo The Chainsmokers, and Erika Moore.

Other weekend slots (after 10 am on Saturdays and 9 am on Sundays) are usually filled by such presenters as Fin Robertson, Raynor Perreau, Jayden King, Luka Campbell, Jesse Williamson, Warwick, Mel and Sean Hill.

Promotions

Quit Your Day Job

Quit Your Day Job returned in November 2019 to find Jono Pryor and Ben Boyce's replacement on The Edge Afternoons with Sharyn Casey, with Pryor and Boyce leaving at the end of 2019 to go to Radio Hauraki (although they were moved to The Hits before starting at Radio Hauraki). Jayden King was successful and joined Sharyn for The Edge Afternoons with Sharyn & Jayden in January 2020.

Desperate Housewives vs Crazy Frog

Run in September 2005, in order to win $3,000, three mothers and their children had a sit in a caravan while The Crazy Frog played over and over again; in order to win the mother and her child had to stay in the caravan until Axel F from The Crazy Frog had played for 72 hours (around 3000 times). There were various complaints about this competition and CYFS actually offered to give the contestant $2,000 if she forfeited from the competition immediately.

Summer Jam and Edgefest 
Every summer between 2001 and 2006, The Edge put on major concerts featuring popular bands from its playlists. Starting as Summer Jam, the concert series grew significantly over the years, featuring a steadily increasing number of international acts. The first Summer Jam took place in Hamilton, Wellington and Christchurch in 2001 and featured Zed, Stellar*, Breathe, Garageland and international act Killing Heidi. The second Summer Jam in 2002 featured Silverchair as the international act and New Zealand bands The Feelers, Tadpole, Che Fu and Rubicon.In 2003, with The Edge now broadcasting in Auckland the city became a venue alongside Hamilton, Wellington and Christchurch with Good Charlotte playing alongside Taxi Ride, Zed, Nesian Mystik, Rubicon, Carly Binding and Elemeno P.

Summer Jam was rebranded to Edgefest in 2004. Edgefest 04 was held on 6, 7, 12, and 13 March 2004 in Wellington, Christchurch, Auckland, and Hamilton respectively. It featured performances from Shihad, Alien Ant Farm and Yellowcard playing with Elemeno P, The Feelers, Scribe, Blindspott, Zed, Che Fu and the Krates, Nesian Mystik, and Steriogram.
Edgefest 05  was held on 12, 13, 18, and 19 March 2005 in Auckland, Hamilton, Wellington, and Christchurch respectively. It included performances from Chingy, Blindspott, The Feelers, P-Money, Steriogram, Fast Crew, 48 May, Dei Hamo, Misfits of Science, Savage and Goodnight Nurse.
Edgefest 06 was held on 23, 24, 25, and 26 March 2006 in Wellington, Christchurch, Auckland, and Hamilton respectively. It featured performances from P.O.D., Presidents of the United States of America, Matafix, The Living End, Thirsty Merc and Elemeno P, Nesian Mystik, Frontline, Savage Feat. Aaradhna and Goodnight Nurse.
The Edge Summer Jam was revived in 2009 with The Veronicas, Metro Station, P-Money, and Midnight Youth, taking place in Hamilton but not Dunedin.

Accessibility
The Edge is accessible via FM radio throughout the North and South Islands of New Zealand, and online via a webcast.

North Island frequencies

South Island frequencies

External links

References

1994 establishments in New Zealand
Radio stations established in 1994